Mick Namarari Tjapaltjarri (b.c.1926 at Marnpi southeast of Kintore, Northern Territory – 1998), was one of the most important painters to emerge from the Western Desert.

From the Pintupi language group, Mick Namarari was one of the foundation artists of the movement that emerged in Papunya Tula. White school teacher Geoffrey Bardon considered him one of eight artists whose efforts at the foundation of the movement were particularly interesting. The others were Old Walter Tjampitjinpa, Kaapa Tjampitjinpa, Clifford Possum Tjapaltjarri, Tim Leura Tjapaltjarri, Tim Payungka Tjapangati, Charlie Tarawa Tjungurrayi and Johnny Warrangkula Tjupurrula.

From early figurative works, he moved on to creating large geometric designs that typified Papunya Tula art in the late 1970s and early 1980s. In the 1990s he began producing "minimalist" paintings that depicted the imprint of a kangaroo in the sand, the seeds that the marsupial mouse feeds upon, or the aftermath of hailstorms in the desert.

He died in Alice Springs in 1998.

Collections
 National Gallery of Australia, Canberra
 National Gallery of Victoria, Melbourne
 Museum and Art Gallery of the Northern Territory, Darwin
 Kluge-Ruhe Aboriginal Art Collection, University of Virginia, Charlottesville

Awards

Australia Council for the Arts
The Australia Council for the Arts arts funding and advisory body for the Government of Australia. Since 1993, it has awarded a Red Ochre Award. It is presented to an outstanding Indigenous Australian (Aboriginal Australian or Torres Strait Islander) artist for lifetime achievement.

|-
| 1994
| himself
| Red Ochre Award
| 
|-

References

Bibliography

External links
 Mick Namarari Tjapaltjarri at the Art Gallery of New South Wales

Australian Aboriginal artists
Artists from the Northern Territory
1920s births
1998 deaths
Pintupi

https://alecohalloran.com/ See Mick Namarari Tjapaltjarri's authorised biography, The master from Marnpi.